Ole Schwarz (born 29 July 1997) is a German male canoeist who won a medal at senior level at the Wildwater Canoeing World Championships.

Medals at the World Championships
Senior

References

External links
 

1997 births
Living people
German male canoeists
Place of birth missing (living people)